Minden Hills is a township in and the county seat of Haliburton County, Ontario, Canada. It is an amalgam of the townships of Snowdon, Lutterworth, Anson, Hindon and Minden. It is usually referred to as Minden, after its largest community.

The township was formed on January 1, 2001, by combining the townships of Lutterworth, Snowdon, Anson, Hindon and Minden.

Communities
The primary residential and commercial centre of the township is Minden, located just off Highway 35.

The township also includes the smaller communities of Blairhampton, Brady Lake, Buller, Carnarvon, Deep Bay, Dutch Line, Gelert, Hindon Hill (abandoned community), Howland, Ingoldsby, Irondale, Kilcoo Harbour, Lochlin, Lutterworth, Miners Bay, and Moore Falls.

Minden
Minden, named after a town in the North Rhine–Westphalia federal state in Germany, was first surveyed in 1858. Before that, the settlement was called Gull River. Settlers were first drawn to the region (via the Bobcaygeon Road, an original colonization road), because of its timber resources. The town lies on the banks of the Gull River and during the 19th and 20th centuries, loggers used the river to move timber to sawmills downstream.

Since the 1940s the town has become an increasingly popular summer destination given its close proximity to larger cities in southern Ontario. The population grows dramatically during the summer months as a result of tourism. The Minden Times and The Highlander are the local newspapers, and the local post office on Water St. serves residents with lock boxes and three rural routes.

The Minden Hills Cultural Centre is home to the Agnes Jamieson Gallery, named after Dr. Agnes Jamieson, the first female coroner in Ontario. The Gallery houses the largest known collection of André Lapine's work. Both Lapine and Jamieson lived in Minden during part of their lives. The Cultural Centre is also home to the Minden Hills Museum, which includes seven heritage buildings, including a school, a blacksmith shop and a church. R.D. Lawrence Place, an interactive learning centre celebrating Canadian author Ron Lawrence, is also located here.

History

2013 flood 
The Gull River flooded in April 2013, leading to a state of emergency declaration on April 20. By May 3, officials were predicting another two weeks of abnormally high water levels in the Trent-Severn Waterway system. The excess water that was held back in the reservoir lakes north of Minden was being slowly released and moved through the village so as not to cause increased damage. The use of the reservoir lakes north of Minden to collect water was necessary to avert a threat to the essential utilities of water, hydro and sewage treatment. However, it extended the flood damage area north throughout the entire Gull River Watershed. Many of the properties on those lakes were damaged.

Residents of the area were evacuated from their homes on short notice and remained out until mid-May. Claims by residents to the Ontario Disaster Relief Assistance Program totaled 1.8 million dollars by November 2013, in addition to an estimated 2.2 million dollars in insured claims. The township spent $370,000 on flood related costs.

2017 flood 
Residents of Minden Hills were again affected by flooding only four years since the massive flood of 2013. Watershed flooding was at its maximum capacity in the reservoir lakes of the Trent Severn Waterway only to be hit with 129 millimeters of rain in late April, increasing flood levels. A state of emergency was put into place on May 6, 2017 for the town of Minden Hills. The Gull River through Minden recorded 5 centimeters lower than the record 2013 flood. A new automated sandbag machine was purchased earlier in March, helping with handling sandbags at a much faster rate for flood relief. Close to 40,000 sandbags being filled by the end of the weekend. Provincial aid was provided after Reeve Brent Devolin had been in contact  with Premier Kathleen Wynne. The Ontario Disaster Relief Assistance Program offered reimbursement for homeowners affected.

2015 Pan Am Games

Minden Wild Water Preserve was a venue of the 2015 Pan Am Games, hosting canoe events.

Demographics 

Local government 

The town's council includes a mayor, deputy mayor, councillor at large and four councillors elected on the basis of two for Ward 1 and one each for Wards 2 & 3, who are elected to join the mayor at meetings of Minden Hills Council. The members of council elected in 2022 are:
 Mayor: Bob Carter
 Deputy Mayor: Lisa Schell
 Councillors:
 At Large: Tammy McKelvey
 Ward 1: Ivan Ingram
 Ward 1: Shirley Johanessen
 Ward 2: Pam Sayne
 Ward 3: Bob Sisson

See also
List of townships in Ontario

References

External links

Township municipalities in Ontario
Lower-tier municipalities in Ontario
Municipalities in Haliburton County